This is a list of Singaporean political dissidents.

J. B. Jeyaretnam
Chee Soon Juan
Chia Thye Poh
Francis Seow
Tan Wah Piow
Amos Yee
Alex Tan
Roy Ngerng
Jolovan Wham
Han Hui Hui
Charles Yeo

See also
Internal Security Act
List of Singaporeans
Human rights in Singapore

References

External links
Human Rights Watch: Info by country: Singapore
Overview of Human Rights Developments 1989
IFEX: Censorship in Singapore

 
Singaporean dissidents, list of